The Munster Literature Centre is a non-profit arts organisation based in Cork city, Ireland. It was founded in 1993 to support the promotion and development of literature in the Munster region. Amongst its activities, the Munster Literature Centre organises writing workshops and festivals, including the Cork International Short Story Festival and Cork Spring Poetry Festival. They also maintain a publishing house, Southword Editions, which publishes, amongst other titles, the literary journal Southword.

Based in Frank O'Connor House, Irish poet Patrick Cotter currently serves as the Centre's Artistic Director.

History 
The Munster Literature Centre was founded in 1993, based on Sullivan's Quay in Cork city. In 2003, the Centre was relocated to its current residence in the house where Irish author Frank O'Connor was born.

Southword Editions 
The Centre's publishing house, Southword Editions, publishes poetry collections and chapbooks, as well as the literary journal, Southword, which was first issued in 2001. Between 2006 and 2010, Southword Editions published an annual Best of Irish Poetry anthology.

Festivals 
Two major literary festivals are organised by the Munster Literature Centre, the Cork International Short Story Festival and Cork Spring Poetry Festival. The Cork International Short Story Festival was established in 2000 as the Frank O'Connor Short Story Festival. The origins of the Cork Spring Poetry Festival can be traced back to the Éigse festival, which first ran alongside the Centre's foundation in 1993.

Literary Prizes 
The Munster Literature Centre awards a number of literary prizes in poetry and short fiction, the most prestigious of which are the Seán Ó Faoláin Short Story Prize and the Gregory O’Donoghue International Poetry Prize, presented since 2002 and 2010 respectively.

References

External links
 Munster Literature Centre

Non-profit organisations based in the Republic of Ireland
Culture in Cork (city)
Irish literature